This article is a list of tours by the France national rugby union team

France Rugby Tours

Stats of each Tour

Argentina

Australia

South Africa

New Zealand

Test Record

Argentina Series

Australia Series

New Zealand Series

South Africa Series

One-off Tests in Argentina, Australia, New Zealand and South Africa

1995 ARG 12-47 FRA Ferrocaril Oeste, Buenos Aires

Others
France's score is first.

External links
  French Stats Website

 
tours